A logarithmic scale (or log scale) is a way of displaying numerical data over a very wide range of values in a compact way.  As opposed to a linear number line in which every unit of distance corresponds to adding by the same amount, on a logarithmic scale, every unit of length corresponds to multiplying the previous value by the same amount.  Hence, such a scale is nonlinear: the numbers 1, 2, 3, 4, 5, and so on, are not equally spaced. Rather, the numbers 10, 100, 1000, 10000, and 100000 would be equally spaced. Likewise, the numbers 2, 4, 8, 16, 32, and so on, would be equally spaced.  Often exponential growth curves are displayed on a log scale, otherwise they would increase too quickly to fit within a small graph.

Common uses

The markings on slide rules are arranged in a log scale for multiplying or dividing numbers by adding or subtracting lengths on the scales.

The following are examples of commonly used logarithmic scales, where a larger quantity results in a higher value:
 Richter magnitude scale and moment magnitude scale (MMS) for strength of earthquakes and movement in the Earth 
 Sound level, with units decibel
 Neper for amplitude, field and power quantities
 Frequency level, with units cent, minor second, major second, and octave for the relative pitch of notes in music
 Logit for odds in statistics
 Palermo Technical Impact Hazard Scale
 Logarithmic timeline
 Counting f-stops for ratios of photographic exposure
 The rule of nines used for rating low probabilities 
 Entropy in thermodynamics
 Information in information theory
 Particle size distribution curves of soil

The following are examples of commonly used logarithmic scales, where a larger quantity results in a lower (or negative) value:
 pH for acidity
 Stellar magnitude scale for brightness of stars
 Krumbein scale for particle size in geology
 Absorbance of light by transparent samples

Some of our senses operate in a logarithmic fashion (Weber–Fechner law), which makes logarithmic scales for these input quantities especially appropriate. In particular, our sense of hearing perceives equal ratios of frequencies as equal differences in pitch. In addition, studies of young children in an isolated tribe have shown logarithmic scales to be the most natural display of numbers in some cultures.

Graphic representation

The top left graph is linear in the X and Y axes, and the Y-axis ranges from 0 to 10. A base-10 log scale is used for the Y axis of the bottom left graph, and the Y axis ranges from 0.1 to 1,000.

The top right graph uses a log-10 scale for just the X axis, and the bottom right graph uses a log-10 scale for both the X axis and the Y axis.

Presentation of data on a logarithmic scale can be helpful when the data:

 covers a large range of values, since the use of the logarithms of the values rather than the actual values reduces a wide range to a more manageable size;
 may contain exponential laws or power laws, since these will show up as straight lines.

A slide rule has logarithmic scales, and nomograms often employ logarithmic scales. The geometric mean of two numbers is midway between the numbers. Before the advent of computer graphics, logarithmic graph paper was a commonly used scientific tool.

Log–log plots

If both the vertical and horizontal axes of a plot are scaled logarithmically, the plot is referred to as a log–log plot.

Semi-logarithmic plots

If only the ordinate or abscissa is scaled logarithmically, the plot is referred to as a semi-logarithmic plot.

Extensions
A modified log transform can be defined for negative input (y<0) and to avoid the singularity for zero input (y=0) so as to produce symmetric log plots:

for a constant C=1/ln(10).

Logarithmic units
A logarithmic unit is a unit that can be used to express a quantity (physical or mathematical) on a logarithmic scale, that is, as being proportional to the value of a logarithm function applied to the ratio of the quantity and a reference quantity of the same type. The choice of unit generally indicates the type of quantity and the base of the logarithm.

Examples
Examples of logarithmic units include units of data storage capacity (bit, byte), of information and information entropy (nat, shannon, ban), and of signal level (decibel, bel, neper).  Logarithmic frequency quantities are used in electronics (decade, octave) and for music pitch intervals (octave, semitone, cent, etc.).  Other logarithmic scale units include the Richter magnitude scale point.

In addition, several industrial measures are logarithmic, such as standard values for resistors, the American wire gauge, the Birmingham gauge used for wire and needles, and so on.

Units of information
 bit, byte
 hartley
 nat
 shannon

Units of level or level difference

 bel, decibel
 neper

Units of frequency interval
 decade, decidecade, savart
 octave, tone, semitone, cent

Table of examples

The two definitions of a decibel are equivalent, because a ratio of power quantities is equal to the square of the corresponding ratio of root-power quantities.

See also 

 Alexander Graham Bell
 Bode plot
 Geometric mean (arithmetic mean in logscale)
 John Napier
 Level (logarithmic quantity)
 Logarithm
 Logarithmic mean
 Log semiring
 Preferred number
 Semi-log plot

Scale
 Order of magnitude

Applications
 Entropy
 Entropy (information theory)
 pH
 Richter magnitude scale

References

Further reading

 
 
  (135 pages)

External links

 Non-Newtonian calculus website

 
Non-Newtonian calculus